Bernard Jackson may refer to:

American football
 Bernard Jackson (Arena football) (born 1980), fullback/linebacker for the Kentucky Horsemen
 Bernard Jackson (defensive back) (1950–1997), American football player
 Bernard Jackson (quarterback) (born 1985), former quarterback for the Colorado Buffaloes

Other people
 Bernard Jackson (professor), former law professor
 Bernard Jackson (singer) (born 1963), American singer with Surface
 C. Bernard Jackson (1927–1996), American playwright

See also
 Bernie Jackson (born 1961), American sprinter